Barnham station can mean either

 Barnham railway station a railway station serving Barnham, West Sussex.
 Barnham railway station (Suffolk) a former railway station in Barnham, Suffolk.